Ian Dale or Iain Dale may refer to:

 Ian Anthony Dale (born 1978), American actor
 Iain Dale (born 1962), British conservative blogger